José Ignacio is a resort (balneario) in the Maldonado Department of southeastern Uruguay.

Geography
The resort is located on the coast of the Atlantic Ocean, on Route 10, east of José Ignacio Lagoon.

A notable feature is the Punta José Ignacio Lighthouse.

History
In April 1873 the British ship Norman got wrecked near José Ignacio.

Population
In 2011 José Ignacio had a population of 292 permanent inhabitants.

References

External links

 José Ignacio, Uruguay.
 Instituto Nacional de Estadística: Plano de Faro José Ignacio y Arenas de José Ignacio

Populated places in the Maldonado Department
Seaside resorts in Uruguay